Zhu Xinyuan (born 1880) was a politician and diplomat in the Republic of China. He was an important politician during the Provisional Government of the Republic of China and the Wang Jingwei regime. His courtesy name was Yanxi. He was born in Daxing, Zhili (now Beijing).

Biography 
Zhu Xingyuan was a graduate of the Peking Imperial University with the degree of Juren. After his graduation, he went to Japan where he studied for 2 years in the Chuo University.

In August 1912 Zhu Xingyuan was appointed junior secretary of the Ministry for Foreign Affairs. In next September, he was promoted to be senior secretary of the same Ministry. In December he was appointed First Secretary to the Chinese Legation at Washington D.C. In July 1918 he was again appointed secretary of the Ministry for Foreign Affairs and to act concurrently as Councilor of the Ministry. In August 1919 he was appointed a member of the commission to supervise the Examination for Diplomatic and Consular Officials. In the same month he was appointed Secretary to the Ministry for Communications. In October 1920 he was appointed Commissioner of Foreign Affairs for Zhili. He held this position until December 1924.

In National Government Zhu Xingyuan was appointed a member of the Beiping (Peking) City Government. In 1930 he was appointed Chief of the Section for Asian Affairs of the Bureau for Foreign Affairs, the General Headquarters for Army, Navy and Air Force. In next December he was transferred to Councilor of the Ministry for Foreign Affairs. Later he successively held the positions of Adviser of the same Ministry and member of the Beiping City Government.

After the Second Sino-Japanese War broke out, Zhu Xingyuan participated to the Provisional Government of the Republic of China where he was appointed Chief of the Bureau for Social Affairs of the Tianjin Special City. After establishing the Wang Jingwei regime, in May 1940 he was appointed to Chief of the Bureau for Foreign Affairs of the Agency for Political Affairs, the North China Political Council. In July he was promoted to be Chief of the Agency of Political Affairs. In March 1942 he resigned his post, and was transferred to a member of the North China Political Council.

After that, the whereabouts of Zhu Xingyuan were unknown.

Alma mater

Peking UniversityChuo University

Awards and decorations

Order of Wen-Hu

References

Sources 

 
 
 

Republic of China politicians from Beijing
Chinese collaborators with Imperial Japan
1880 births
Year of death uncertain